Earl Clifford Henry (June 10, 1917 – December 10, 2002), nicknamed "Hook", was a Major League Baseball pitcher who played for two seasons. He pitched two games for the Cleveland Indians during the 1944 Cleveland Indians season and 15 games during the 1945 Cleveland Indians season.

External links

1917 births
2002 deaths
Major League Baseball pitchers
Cleveland Indians players
Baseball players from Ohio